The Reichssicherheitsdienst (RSD, lit. "Reich security service") was an SS security force of Nazi Germany. Originally bodyguards for Adolf Hitler, it later provided men for the protection of other high-ranking leaders of the Nazi regime. The group, although similar in name, was completely separate from the Sicherheitsdienst (SD), which was the formal intelligence service for the SS, the Nazi Party and later Nazi Germany.

Its role included personal security, investigation of assassination plots, surveillance of locations before the arrival of Nazi dignitaries and vetting buildings as well as guests. The RSD had the power to request assistance from any other SS organisations and take command of all Ordnungspolizei (order police) in its role protecting the Nazi functionaries.

Formation
The RSD was founded on 15 March 1933 as the Führerschutzkommando ("Führer protection command"; FSK) under the command of then SS-Standartenführer Johann Rattenhuber. His deputy was Peter Högl. Originally charged with protecting the Führer only while he was inside the borders of Bavaria, its members consisted of criminal-police detectives of the Bavarian police. Since the small group was made up of Bavarian police officers, they could only operate within the area of their authority. Hitler's protection outside Bavaria was already entrusted to an eight-member bodyguard known as the SS-Begleitkommando des Führers, which was founded on 29 February 1932.

Hitler wanted a home-grown close protection group while in Munich because this was the traditional birthplace of the Nazi Party and where any plots would therefore have added significance. In the spring of 1934, the Führerschutzkommando replaced the SS-Begleitkommando for Hitler's overall protection throughout Germany. In 1935 the FSK squad for Hitler's protection was made up of 17 men. An additional force of 76 FSK men protected other leading members of the party, including Hermann Göring, Rudolf Hess, Joseph Goebbels and Heinrich Himmler; along with performing other security related duties.

The FSK was officially renamed the Reichssicherheitsdienst (Reich Security Service; RSD) on 1 August 1935. Himmler finally gained full control over the RSD in October 1935. Although Himmler was officially named chief, Rattenhuber remained in command and took his orders for the most part from Hitler or a chief aide such as Julius Schaub. Himmler was given administrative control over the RSD and the SS gained influence over its members. As for the SS-Begleitkommando, it was expanded and became known as the Führerbegleitkommando (Führer Escort Command; FBK). The FBK continued under separate command until April 1945 and remained responsible for Hitler's close personal protection.

Pre-war role
The RSD and FBK worked together for security and personal protection during Hitler's trips and public events, but they operated as two groups and used separate vehicles. For those occasions, Rattenhuber would be in overall command and the FBK chief would act as his deputy. Before a trip, the RSD had the responsibly of checking the route, the buildings along the route, and the places which Hitler was to visit. The local Gestapo office would provide intelligence reports, along with information as to any assassination rumours, to the RSD. For motorcades, following Hitler's Mercedes-Benz would be two cars to the left and right, one with FBK men and the other with a detachment of RSD men.

In 1936 a resolution of the Oberkommando der Wehrmacht gave members of the RSD the status of being Wehrmacht officers, but with authority that included extra jurisdictional powers and privileges. It was formally called the Reichssicherheitsdienst Gruppe Geheime Feldpolizei z. b. V (Reich Security Service Group Secret Field Police for special duties/zur besondere Verwendung). They were considered military police officers that were technically on the staff of Reichsfuhrer-SS Himmler with its personnel wearing the uniform of the SS with the Sicherheitsdienst (SD) diamond on the lower left sleeve. Those who were eligible to claim SS membership could join the RSD and all officers had to present proof that they were of German blood. In 1937 all RSD officers were made members of the SS breaking the link to the regular army. By that year, the RSD had 100 men in its ranks.

Wartime operations
On the outbreak of World War II, the RSD had 200 men in its ranks. It protected Hitler, along with other government and inner circle members as they travelled around occupied Europe. By 1944, there were seventeen RSD units protecting the top leadership.

As RSD commander Rattenhuber was responsible for securing Hitler's field headquarters. In particular, a battalion guarded the Wolf's Lair near the town of Rastenburg, now Kętrzyn in Poland. Rattenhuber's deputy, Peter Högl was appointed Chief of RSD Department 1 (responsible for the personal protection of Hitler on a day-to-day basis during the war). The Wolf's Lair had three security zones. Sperrkreis 1 (Security Zone 1) was located at the heart of the Wolf's Lair. Hitler first arrived at the Wolf's Lair on 23 June 1941 and departed for the last time on 20 November 1944. Overall, he spent over 800 days there during that three and half year period.

By early 1945, Germany's military situation was on the verge of total collapse. In January 1945, Rattenhuber accompanied Hitler and his entourage into the bunker complex under the Reich Chancellery garden in the central government sector of Berlin. The FBK and the rest of Hitler's personal staff moved into the Vorbunker and Führerbunker. FBK and RSD men were stationed outside the Führerbunker entrances. Main entry into the Führerbunker was from a stairway built at right angles leading down from the Vorbunker. After descending the stairs into the lower section, RSD and FBK men were positioned in a guard room to check identity cards and search briefcases, before personnel were allowed to pass into the corridor of the Führerbunker proper.

To the Nazi leadership it was clear that the battle for Berlin, which started in late April, would be the final battle of the war. On 27 April 1945, Högl was sent out to find Himmler's liaison man, SS-Gruppenführer Hermann Fegelein who had deserted his post at the Führerbunker. Fegelein was caught by Högl's RSD squad in his Berlin apartment, wearing civilian clothes and preparing to flee to Sweden or Switzerland. He was carrying cash—German and foreign—and jewellery, some of which belonged to Eva Braun. Högl also uncovered a briefcase containing documents with evidence of Himmler's attempted peace negotiations with the western Allies. Fegelein was brought back to the Führerbunker and then shot on 28 April. After Hitler committed suicide on 30 April, Rattenhuber and the remaining RSD officers were taken prisoner by the Soviet Red Army on 1 May 1945 during the attempted break-out from central Berlin to avoid capture. After the war ended, Rattenhuber served 10 years in prison before being released by the Soviets on 10 October 1955.

See also
Führerbegleitbrigade, an armored unit of the German Army, which provided Adolf Hitler with battlefield security. 
Feldgendarmerie, the German military police in World War II.

References

Citations

Bibliography
 
 
 
 
 

Nazi SS
Protective security units
Wehrmacht
German words and phrases
1933 establishments in Germany